The Senftenberg Solarpark is a photovoltaic power station located on former open-pit mining areas close to the city of Senftenberg, in Eastern Germany. The 78 MW Phase 1 of the plant was completed within three months and generates power for about 25,000 households. The ground-based PV plant is designed for a total capacity of 148 MW.

Solarpark Senftenberg/Schipkau

References 

Photovoltaic power stations in Germany
Solarpark